This is the order of battle for Operation Badr, an Egyptian military operation that initiated the Yom Kippur War against Israel along the Suez Canal in the Sinai on October 6, 1973. As neither belligerent has released an official order of battle, this list remains incomplete (for example, concerning brigades within divisions of the Third Army) and largely conjectural. An asterisk indicates Egyptian units that participated in the operation.

The Sa'iqa (lit. "lightning") were Egyptian commando forces.

Egyptian Army

General Headquarters (Center Ten):

Commander in Chief - Colonel General Ahmad Ismail Ali

Chief of Staff - Lieutenant General Saad El Shazly

Chief of Operations - Lieutenant General Abdel Ghani el-Gamasy

Engineer-in-Chief - Major General Gamal Mohamed Aly

Chief of Military Intelligence - Major General Ibrahim Fouad Nassar

Port Said Sector (Port Said and Port Fouad) - Maj Gen Omar Khalid
30th Independent Infantry Brigade* - Brigadier General Mohamed Salah el-Din
135th Independent Infantry Brigade* - Colonel Mustafa el-'Abbassi
10th Mechanised Brigade (in reserve)
Second Field Army (Northern Canal Zone) - Maj Gen Sa'adeddin Ma'moun
Chief of Staff - Maj Gen Tayseer Aqad
Chief of Artillery - Maj Gen Mohamed Abd el Halim Abu Ghazala
18th Infantry Division* - Brig Gen Fuad 'Aziz Ghali
90th Infantry Brigade
134th Infantry Brigade
136th Mechanized Infantry Brigade
2nd Infantry Division* - Brig Gen Hassan Abu Sa'ada
4th Infantry Brigade
120th Infantry Brigade
117th Mechanized Infantry Brigade
16th Infantry Division* - Brig Gen Abd Rab el-Nabi Hafez
16th Infantry Brigade - Abdel-Hamid Abdel-Sami
112th Infantry Brigade
3rd Mechanized Infantry Brigade
21st Armored Division - Brig Ibrahim El-Orabi
1st Armored Brigade: Mohamed Taufik Abu Shady (killed), replaced by Sayyid Saleh
14th Armored Brigade*: Othman Kamel
18th Mechanised Brigade: Talaat Muslim
23rd Mechanised Division - Brig Gen Ahmad 'Aboud el Zommer, Hassan Abdel-Latif
24th Armored Brigade*
116th Mechanised Brigade - Hussein Ridwan (killed)
118th Mechanised Brigade
15th Independent Armored Brigade* - Col Tahseen Shanan
Third Field Army (Southern Canal Zone) - Maj Gen Mohamed Abdel Munim Wasel
Chief of Staff - Maj Gen Mustafa Shaheen
Chief of Artillery - Maj Gen Munir Shash
7th Infantry Division* - Brig Gen Ahmad Badawi Said Ahmad
2nd Infantry Brigade
11th Mechanized Infantry Brigade
8th Mechanized Infantry Brigade
19th Infantry Division* - Brig Gen Yusuf Afifi Mohamed
5th Infantry Brigade
7th Infantry Brigade
2nd Mechanized Infantry Brigade
4th Armored Division - Brig Gen Mohamed Abd el Aziz Qabil
2nd Armored Brigade
3rd Armored Brigade* - Brig Noureddin Abdel-Aziz (killed)
6th Armored Brigade
6th Mechanised Division - Brig Gen Mohamed AbulFath Muharam
22nd Armored Brigade*
113th Mechanised Brigade
1st Mechanised Brigade
130th Independent Amphibious Brigade - Col Mahmoud Shu'aib
25th Independent Armored Brigade* - Col Ahmed Helmy Badawy
Sa'ka Forces - Maj Gen Nabeel Shukry
127th Sa'ka Group - Col Fuad Basyuni
129th Sa'ka Group- Col Ali Heykal
136th Sa'ka Group - Col Kamal Atiyah
139th Sa'ka Group  - Col Osama Ibrahim
145th Sa'ka Group - Col El-Sayid Sharqawy

Most sources use Dupuy's commando brigade designations: 127, 128, 129, 130, 131, 132, and 134. But Dani Asher clearly defines six commando groups (group = brigade size). Each group contained 3 to 5 commando battalions totalling 24 battalions. He doesn't identify the groups, but from Arab sources, the following designations are available: 39, 127, 129, 136, 139, and 145.

Israeli Defense Force

Minister of Defense - Lt Gen (ret.) Moshe Dayan

Chief of Staff - Lt Gen David Elazar

Deputy Chief of Staff - Maj Gen Israel Tal

Head of Operations - Maj Gen Abraham Tamir

Head of Intelligence - Maj Gen Eli Zeira

Southern Command: Maj. Gen. Shmuel Gonen

252nd Armored Division - Maj. Gen. Abraham 'Albert' Mandler
8th Armored Brigade - Col Aryeh Dayan
14th Armored Brigade - Col Amnon Reshef
401st Armored Brigade - Col Dan Shomron
460th Armored Brigade - Col Gabi Amir
'Harel' Brigade - Col Abraham Bar-Am
11th Reserve Mechanized Brigade - Col Aharon Peled
+Mechanised Infantry and Paratroop support

162nd Reserve Armored Division - Maj. Gen. Abraham 'Bren' Adan
217th Reserve Armored Brigade - Col Natke Nir
460th Armored Brigade - Col Gabi Amir
500th Reserve Armored Brigade - Col Aryeh Keren
+Mechanised Infantry and Paratroop support including: 35th Paratroop Brigade - Col Uzi Yairi

143rd Reserve Armored Division - Maj. Gen. Ariel 'Arik' Sharon
14th Armored Brigade - Col Amnon Reshef
600th Reserve Armored Brigade - Col Tuvia Raviv
421st Brigade - Col Haim Erez
243rd Paratroop Brigade - Col Danny Matt
+Mechanized Infantry units

Footnotes

References

Further reading 
 Tons of information from a former Israeli intelligence official that has never before been published in English.

Yom Kippur War
Orders of battle